Collège Soeurs de La Charité de Saint-Louis de Bourdon or simply Collège Saint-Louis de Bourdon is a private, Roman Catholic institution located in the borough of Bourdon, situated between the center of Port-au-Prince in Pétion-Ville, Haiti. The school follows the Haitian education system, with a primary school offering  grades 13 (or k)-6, and a secondary schools from grade 7-to philo.

History                                              
The school was founded by the Sisters of Charity of St. Louis, a congregation created in France by Marie Louise Elizabeth de Lamoignon on May 25, 1803. Gradually, the congregation had branched internationally to better accomplish their goal of offering a learning experience to young girls who don´t have the condition to pay extremely high prices for quality education. This long journey eventually led to Haiti.

Curriculum
Both schools provides a curriculum rooted in Roman Catholicism and a strong sense of civic duty with daily prayer and other religious activities formally integrated as part of the learning process. At a very early age, students tend to be given individual projects requiring presentation in front of an audience to boost their confidence. In addition to following the criteria of the Haitian Department of Education, both schools offer a range of electives such as sewing, cooking, banking, arts and crafts, creative writing, engineering as well as computer sciences.

Extracurricular activities
The secondary school occasionally participates in basketball and volleyball championships organized by the Department of Education in Haiti.

Notable alumni
 Alessandra Lemoine Polynice, anchor and television producer
 Gessica Geneus, actress
 Maryse Pierre-Louis, journalist
 Camille Vilain, WNBA player
 Dina Simon, director of Human Resources for the City of New York
 Maureen Mia Aurelus, CRNA
 Stephanie Patricia Seme, researcher
 France Micklove Leandre, physician
 Stéphanie Balmir, writer 
Vanessa Irlande Joseph, Psychologist
 Wista Délice (Wista Joubert), Social Worker and Professor at Faculté des Sciences Humaines of State University of Haiti

Genevieve Gordon

References

Catholic schools in Haiti